Nancy Eileen McEldowney (born October 6, 1958) is an American academic and diplomat who served as the national security advisor to Vice President Kamala Harris from January 20, 2021 to March 21, 2022. She was previously a career Foreign Service officer, served as United States ambassador to Bulgaria (2008–2009), and was director of the Foreign Service Institute from February 2013 until June 2017.

Early life and education 
McEldowney was born and raised in Clearwater, Florida. After graduating from Clearwater High School, McEldowney earned a bachelor's degree from the New College of Florida, as well as master's degrees from the Columbia University School of International and Public Affairs and National Defense University. McEldowney has studied a number of languages, including French, Spanish, Russian, and Latin, and received professional training in Arabic, Azerbaijani, German, and Turkish.

Career
As director of the Foreign Service Institute, McEldowney served as the chief learning officer in the United States Department of State.

Prior to her arrival at the Foreign Service Institute, McEldowney served as the interim president and senior vice president of the National Defense University from 2011 to 2013. She was also the principal deputy assistant secretary of state for European affairs from 2009 to 2011.

Overseas, McEldowney served as the ambassador to Bulgaria from 2008 to 2009, as well as the deputy chief of mission in Turkey from 2005 to 2008 and in Azerbaijan from 2001 to 2004.

McEldowney received the Joint Distinguished Civilian Service Award from the chairman of the Joint Chiefs of Staff in 2013. She also received the Order of Stara Planina (Medal of Honor) from the President of Bulgaria in 2009. She has been the recipient of the State Department's Senior Performance Award on nine occasions and the Superior Honor Award on five occasions. She was granted the Sinclair Linguistic Award in 2001. In July 2017, McEldowney became director of the Master of Science in Foreign Service program at Georgetown University.

In November 2020, McEldowney was named a volunteer member of the Joe Biden presidential transition Agency Review Team to support transition efforts related to the United States Department of State.

On December 3, 2020, it was announced that McEldowney would serve as the national security advisor to Vice President-elect Kamala Harris. She resigned in March 2022 and was succeeded by Philip Gordon.

References

External links

United States Department of State: Biography of Nancy McEldowney
Appearance on C-SPAN

|-

1958 births
Living people
Ambassadors of the United States to Bulgaria
New College of Florida alumni
School of International and Public Affairs, Columbia University alumni
National Defense University alumni
United States National Security Council staffers
American women ambassadors
United States Foreign Service personnel
Biden administration personnel
People from Clearwater, Florida
21st-century American women